Brian Martin (born August 18, 1962) is an American former professional basketball player, who had a brief career in the NBA. Born in Fort Smith, Arkansas, he attended Hutchinson Community College and the University of Kansas.

Martin, a 6'9",  forward, was selected by the Indiana Pacers with the 185th overall pick in the 1984 NBA draft. His only NBA season (1985–86) was split with the Portland Trail Blazers and the Seattle SuperSonics.

Martin also had a lengthy career in the Continental Basketball Association (CBA).  In 252 games over six seasons, he averaged 9.0 points and 8.7 rebounds per game.  He played for the Tampa Bay/Rapid City Thrillers, Cedar Rapids Silver Bullets, Columbus Horizon, Omaha Racers and Fort Wayne Fury, winning a league championship with Tampa Bay in 1985.  His best year was the 1985–86 season, when he averaged 11.9 points and 11.6 rebounds per game for Tampa Bay, earning second team All-CBA honors.

Notes

External links
NBA stats @ basketballreference.com

1962 births
Living people
American men's basketball players
Basketball players from Arkansas
Cedar Rapids Silver Bullets players
Columbus Horizon players
Fort Wayne Fury players
Indiana Pacers draft picks
Hutchinson Blue Dragons men's basketball players
Kansas Jayhawks men's basketball players
Portland Trail Blazers players
Rapid City Thrillers players
Seattle SuperSonics players
Small forwards
Sportspeople from Fort Smith, Arkansas
Tampa Bay Thrillers players